John Price (15 September 1913 – 10 December 1996) was a Danish film actor and director, and the father of Danish screenwriter Adam Price. He appeared in 26 films between 1934 and 1982.

Selected filmography
 The Golden Smile (1935)
 Blaavand melder storm (1938)
 Champagnegaloppen (1938)
 Meet Me on Cassiopeia (1951)
 Duellen (1962)
 Tine (1964)
 Der var engang (1966 - directed)
 Neighbours (1966)
 The Man Who Thought Life (1969)

External links

1913 births
1996 deaths
Danish male film actors
Danish film directors
Best Actor Bodil Award winners
20th-century Danish male actors